Animal attacks in the United States may refer to:

 List of fatal alligator attacks in the United States
 List of fatal shark attacks in the United States
 List of fatal snake bites in the United States
 List of fatal dog attacks in the United States

See also 
 Animal attacks in Latin America
 Animal attacks in Australia

United States
Animals in the United States